Rose Marie Nijkamp (born 3 February 2006) is a Dutch tennis player.

Nijkamp has a career high ITF junior combined ranking of 76 achieved on 13 June 2022.

Nijkamp won the 2022 Wimbledon Championships – Girls' doubles title with her Kenyan partner Angella Okutoyi.

Junior Grand Slam titles

Doubles: 1 (1 title)

References

External links

2006 births
Living people
Dutch female tennis players
Wimbledon junior champions
Grand Slam (tennis) champions in girls' doubles
21st-century Dutch women